James Clark McGrew House, also known as the Gibson Property, is a historic home located at Kingwood, Preston County, West Virginia. The house consists of a large main two-story block and a low two-story ell. The oldest section is the northern ell, built in 1841.  The main block was built about 1870. Also on the property are a contributing two-story barn/outbuilding connected to the house with a breezeway and a two-story Gothic Revival barn/carriage house.  The house was built by James McGrew (1813 – 1910), a founding father of West Virginia.

It was listed on the National Register of Historic Places in 1993.

References

Houses on the National Register of Historic Places in West Virginia
Houses in Preston County, West Virginia
National Register of Historic Places in Preston County, West Virginia
Houses completed in 1841
Houses completed in 1870
Italianate architecture in West Virginia
Federal architecture in West Virginia
Gothic Revival architecture in West Virginia